Paredes is a Spanish and Portuguese surname. Notable people with the surname include:

Alejandra Paredes (born 1983), Ecuadorian actress
Americo Paredes (1915-1999), Mexican-American author
Ángela García de Paredes (born 1958), Spanish architect
Armando Paredes (born 1984), Ecuadorian  football player
Carlos Humberto Paredes (born 1976), Paraguayan football player
Carlos Paredes (1925-2004), Portuguese guitarist
Edward Paredes (born 1986), Dominican baseball player
Enoli Paredes (born 1995), Dominican baseball player
Esteban Paredes (born 1980), Chilean football player
Frederico Paredes (1889-1972), Portuguese fencer
Isaac Paredes (born 1999), Mexican baseball player
Javier Paredes (born 1980), Spanish football player
Jim Paredes (born 1951), Filipino musician
Jimmy Paredes (born 1988), Dominican baseball player
Johnny Paredes (born 1962), Venezuelan baseball player
Juan Carlos Paredes (born 1987), Ecuadorian football player
Julieta Paredes (born c. 1967), Bolivian poet and writer
Leandro Paredes (born 1994), Argentine football player
Kevin Paredes (born 2003), American soccer player
Mariano Paredes (President of Mexico) (1797-1849)
Mariano Paredes (President of Guatemala) (1800-1856)
Mariano Paredes (artist) (1912-1980), Mexican artist
Marisa Paredes (born 1946), Spanish actress
Matías Paredes (born 1982), Argentine hockey player
Pablo Paredes, Iraq War resister
Rubén Darío Paredes, military ruler of Panama, 1982-83
William Paredes (born 1985), Mexican footballer

Spanish-language surnames
Portuguese-language surnames